The following events occurred in February 1966:

February 1, 1966 (Tuesday)
West Germany bartered for the release of 2,600 political prisoners from East Germany by a transaction involving the export of $24,250,000 worth of West German consumer goods to their East German neighbors, in return for allowing the prisoners to depart the Communist nation. The New York Times described the agreement as "payment of ransom of up to $10,000 per prisoner". The goods, scarce in the East and abundant in the West, were items such as coffee, fresh fruit and butter, as well as fertilizer.

International pressure against the white-minority government of Rhodesia (now Zimbabwe) was stepped up when three major airlines serving the nation— British Overseas Airways Corporation (BOAC), British United Airways and Alitalia— made their last flights into the capital at Salisbury (now Harare), then departed and canceled further service.
In the United States, 19 employees of the John W. Campbell farms in Dade County, Florida, were killed when the bus they were riding in was struck by a freight train.  The men were being brought home after a day's work of harvesting vegetables, and the Seaboard Lines train was on its way to the farm to pick up the cars that had been loaded with produce. All of the dead were migrant workers from Puerto Rico, and most of them were young men in their 20s.
Died: 
Buster Keaton, 70, American film comedian, of lung cancer
Hedda Hopper, 80, American gossip columnist, of double pneumonia

February 2, 1966 (Wednesday)
At Belmore Park in Sydney, three young Australian men became the first people to burn their draft registration cards as a protest against Australia's participation in the Vietnam War. Wayne Haylen, Barry Robinson and Greg Barker stood before a crowd of 200 people and declared their intention to refuse the draft.
Go-Set, Australia's first pop music newspaper, was launched in Melbourne.
A vulture collided with a Pakistan International Airlines helicopter, causing a rotor blade to tear off, and killing 24 of the 25 people on board. The accident occurred as the helicopter was approaching a landing in Faridpur in what is now Bangladesh.
American adventurer Nick Piantanida set off in the Strato Jump II from a park in Sioux Falls, South Dakota, in an attempt to make the highest parachute jump ever, and inadvertently reached the highest altitude ever reached by a balloonist. At , he aborted the parachute jump, separated the gondola from the balloon, and spent the next 32 minutes descending to Earth while the gondola's parachute system slowed his fall. Besides not being able to set the parachute record, he did not set an officially recognized altitude record either, because he had returned to Earth without the balloon. Three months later, on May 1, Pantanida would make a new attempt to set a record, but would suffer a fatal accident on Strato Jump III.
A mission planning meeting for Project Gemini flights IX through XII, held at McDonnell, was attended by members of the Gemini Program Office and Flight Operations Division. The last item on the agenda was a reminder from McDonnell that the Gemini spacecraft was capable of flying to a relatively high elliptic orbit from which it could safely reenter under certain circumstances. The type of orbit McDonnell suggested had an apogee of 500-700 nautical miles. This would involve using the Agena primary propulsion system both to get into this orbit and to return to a  circular orbit for nominal reentry.
Agena D (AD-129) was accepted by the United States Air Force for delivery to the Gemini program. It was transferred to the final assembly area at Sunnyvale, California, for modification to Gemini Agena target vehicle 5005.

February 3, 1966 (Thursday)
At 18:45:30 UTC (9:45 p.m. in Moscow), the uncrewed Soviet Luna 9 became the first object to make a controlled landing on the Moon, touching down in the Oceanus Procellarum to the northwest of the Reiner crater. It began transmitting signals four minutes later, and within 20 minutes of landing, sent back the first ground-level photographs of the Moon's surface. The pictures would yield an important discovery, demonstrating that the surface of the Moon was solid rock, rather than the accumulation of eons of dust deposits, and therefore would be suitable for a human landing.

February 4, 1966 (Friday)
All Nippon Airways Flight 60 plunged into Tokyo Bay, and all 126 passengers and seven crew on board were killed. The Boeing 727 jet had taken off from Sapporo and was making its approach to Tokyo at 6:59 p.m. when it descended into the water short of the runway and broke apart and sank. At the time, the 133 deaths were the largest single-plane fatality and the second deadliest plane crash in history.
Physicist Peter P. Sorokin and his colleague John K. Lankard demonstrated the first dye laser (and the first to provide output from a liquid solution) at IBM's Thomas J. Watson Research Center in Yorktown Heights, New York.
The augmented target docking adapter (ATDA) arrived at Cape Kennedy. Modifications, testing, and troubleshooting were completed March 4. The ATDA, which was intended to back up the Gemini Agena target vehicle (GATV), was then placed in storage (March 8) where it remained until May 17, when the failure of target launch vehicle 5303 prevented GATV 5004 from achieving orbit. The ATDA became the target for Gemini IX-A.
Died:
Sir Lance Brisbane, 72, Australian industrialist
Gilbert Hovey Grosvenor, 90, American publisher who built the National Geographic Society into a worldwide institution through publication of its magazine National Geographic

February 5, 1966 (Saturday)
At the annual four-man bobsled world championships at Cortina D'Ampezzo in Italy, the members of the West German team were injured after their sled failed to negotiate a sharp curve and crashed. The driver, Anton "Toni" Pensperger, never regained consciousness and died of brain and spinal cord injuries at the local hospital. Rider Roland Ebert and brakeman Ludwig Siebert were unconscious, while the fourth teammate, Helmut Werzer, was only slightly hurt.
The day after Pierre Harmel announced that he would resign as Prime Minister of Belgium because physicians had threatened to go on strike at midnight on Sunday, King Baudouin refused to accept the resignation and explained his reasons in a two-page letter. Harmel would finally step aside six weeks later in favor of Paul Vanden Boeynants.
Born: José María Olazábal, Spanish golfer, in Hondarribia

February 6, 1966 (Sunday)
In elections in Liechtenstein, the Progressive Citizens' Party retained its narrow 8 to 7 seat lead over the Patriotic Union in the 15-member Landtag, as the two parties worked at forming a coalition for the ninth consecutive election in 30 years. 
The last original episode of the American TV sitcom Mister Ed was broadcast on CBS. In its first five seasons, from 1961 to 1965, the show about a talking horse had been telecast in the evening.  In its final outing, it was moved to Sunday afternoons at 5:00 p.m.
In Oslo, Fred Anton Maier of Norway broke the world record in the men's 10,000 meter speed skating event in a five nation competition.  Maier, who completed 10 kilometers in 15 minutes, 32.2 seconds, broke the existing mark, set by Jonny Nilsson of Sweden in 1963, by 0.8 seconds.
Born: Rick Astley, English pop music singer, in Great Sankey, Cheshire
Died: 
Narcisa de Leon, 88, Filipina film producer
Abdurrahman Nafiz Gürman, 84, Turkish general

February 7, 1966 (Monday)
Television was broadcast in South Vietnam for the first time, as the United States Navy used "Stratovision", sending a C-121 Constellation airplane to carry transmitting equipment, videotape machines and a small television studio aloft.
Paul Williams and other students at Swarthmore College published the first issue of the rock music magazine Crawdaddy!, starting with ten pages of material and 500 copies printed on a mimeograph machine. The publication, which preceded Rolling Stone by almost two years, would develop into a mass market publication lasting through 1979, and being revived by Williams from 1993 to 2003.
U.S. President Lyndon B. Johnson and Premier Nguyễn Cao Kỳ of South Vietnam convened with other officials in Honolulu, Hawaii, to discuss the course of the Vietnam War.
Born: Kristin Otto, German Olympic swimming champion who won six gold medals for East Germany in the 1988 Summer Olympics; in Leipzig

February 8, 1966 (Tuesday)
The Tugu Nagara, Malaysia's National Monument to commemorate the lives of the 11,000 people who died in combat during the Malayan Emergency, was unveiled in a ceremony in near Kuala Lumpur, by Ismail Nasiruddin of Terengganu, the elected monarch (Yang di-Pertuan Agong) The world's tallest bronze freestanding sculpture features seven statues of Malay fighters and has the inscription, "Dedicated to the Heroic Fighters in the Cause of Peace and Freedom— May the Blessing of Allah Be upon Them."

February 9, 1966 (Wednesday)
Sir John Paul, who had served as the Governor-General of The Gambia since the West African nation's grant of independence from the United Kingdom a year earlier, stepped aside in favor of a Gambian native, Sir Farimang Singateh. Singateh would preside as the Head of State on behalf of Queen Elizabeth II until 1970, when the Gambia would become a republic.
The Board of Governors of the six-team National Hockey League voted to admit six expansion franchises, out of 18 candidates, for the 1966–1967 season, doubling the NHL's size. The existing teams in Boston, Chicago, Detroit, Montreal, New York, and Toronto, would be joined by clubs at Los Angeles, Minnesota, Philadelphia, Pittsburgh, St. Louis and San Francisco.
The Dow Jones Industrial Average closed at a record level of 995 points, then gradually declined by more than 25% over the next seven months, closing at 744.32 on October 8.
The Combined Systems Acceptance Test of Gemini launch vehicle (GLV) 9 was successfully conducted in the vertical test facility at Martin-Baltimore. The vehicle acceptance team convened February 14 and concluded its review on February 17 by accepting the vehicle. Deerection of GLV-9 was completed February 25, and the vehicle was formally accepted by the Air Force March 8. Stage I arrived at Cape Kennedy on March 9, stage II on March 10.
Died:
Paul Sophus Epstein, 82 Russian-American mathematical physicist and pioneer in quantum mechanics
Sophie Tucker, 79, Russian-born U.S. singer, comedian, actress, and radio personality
Richard Raymond Willis, 89, Royal Army officer and one of six recipients of the Victoria Cross for heroism in the Gallipoli Campaign in 1915

February 10, 1966 (Thursday)
Valley of the Dolls, by author Jacqueline Susann, was released by publisher Bernard Geis Associates and quickly rose to become the number one best-selling novel. From a friend, Susann had obtained a list of the bookstores upon which The New York Times relied on sales figures to determine its bestseller list. She then used her own money to buy large quantities of the book at these stores, resulting in her novel going to #1 on the list. Valley of the Dolls would go on to rank among the best selling novels of all time.
Gemini launch vehicle 8 and spacecraft 8 were electrically mated; the Electrical Interface Integrated Validation and Joint Guidance and Control Test was completed February 14. After data from this test were reviewed (February 15), the Joint Combined Systems Test was run February 16.
Died:
Ryan DeGraffenried Sr., 40, American attorney and candidate for the Democratic Party nomination for Governor of Alabama, was killed in a plane crash after making a campaign speech in Fort Payne, Alabama. Despite being warned of high winds, DeGraffenried and pilot Bob Hoskins took off from Fort Payne to fly to Gadsden in a Cessna 310, which crashed into a hillside four minutes later.
Major-General J. F. C. Fuller, 87, British Army strategist and military historian

February 11, 1966 (Friday)
The final, deciding Test match in the 1965–66 Ashes series opened in Melbourne.
The Soviet Union launched the Kosmos 108 research satellite.
Deputy Mayor Robert Price ordered New York City's "Crash Clean-up Campaign", to be administered by Assistant Commissioner Sidney Davidoff of the city's Department of Buildings. A forty-block area within East New York, Brooklyn (and bounded by Pennsylvania Avenue, Sutter, Van Sinderen and New Lots Avenues) was targeted for urban renewal, and by the end of the campaign, 80 buildings were targeted for demolition. Ultimately, though, inspectors were withdrawn with no followup, "leaving most of the housing in the same condition as it was found".
Marshall Space Flight Center (MSFC) submitted its response to the call from NASA Headquarters for project management proposals for the Apollo telescope mount (ATM). The plan summarized Marshall's developmental work on ATM-type systems so far and contained specific technical and managerial concepts for implementing the ATM project. Of all its inherent strengths and capabilities, the Center emphasized the talents concentrated in the Research Projects Laboratory under Ernst Stuhlinger, the scientific arm of the Center.
Born: Dieudonné M'bala M'bala, French comedian, actor, and political activist, in Fontenay-aux-Roses

February 12, 1966 (Saturday)
The Tây Vinh Massacre was purported to have been conducted by the ROK Capital Division of South Korean Army soldiers stationed in South Vietnam, in the Tây Sơn District of Bình Định Province in South Vietnam.  During the operation, the Capital Division was reported to have assaulted 15 hamlets and killed over 1,000 civilians. In one hamlet, the ROK soldiers rounded up and shot 68 villagers. Only 3 villagers survived.
Sheikh Mujibur Rahman, President of the Awami League that represented the Bengali people in the Eastern enclave of the nation of Pakistan, unveiled what he referred to as the Six Point Program for future relations with the Urdu people who predominated in West Pakistan and controlled the national government.  Rahman proposed that Pakistan should be a federation of two autonomous sections, with separate currencies, that the national government should be responsible only for Pakistan's defense and foreign affairs, and that the national legislature be an elected body with seats based on proportional representation.  The civil disorder between the two sections of Pakistan, located to the east and west of India, when Rahman would declare East Pakistan independent as the nation of Bangladesh in 1971.
Five members of the Politburo of the Chinese Communist Party, led by Beijing Mayor Peng Zhen, issued a report called the "February Outline", setting recommendations for drastic reforms that would become the Cultural Revolution.
The tradition of "Festivus" was first observed by the father of scriptwriter Dan O'Keefe.  O'Keefe would later make the unique family observation the basis for the December 18, 1997 episode of the popular TV sitcom Seinfeld.  The episode proved so popular that "Festivus" would be celebrated by other families as an alternative component to the December holiday season.
Rabbi Morris Adler (1906-1966), leading conservative rabbi in Detroit (at Shaarey Zedek, Detroit and later Southfield, Michigan) and author of The World of the Talmud; was shot by a member of his congregation while leading Sabbath services; he died twenty-seven days later on March 11, 1966.
At the 18th Directors Guild of America Awards, The Sound of Music was named Best Film.

February 13, 1966 (Sunday)
In what one author has described as "the single largest contribution made by drones during the Vietnam War", a Firebee 147E unmanned aircraft with electronic intelligence monitors was sent on a one-way mission to be shot down by the SA-2 antiaircraft radar and missile defense system being used by North Vietnam.  The drone was picked up by the radar and destroyed, but not before "finally acquiring the long-mysterious command uplink and downlink signals" that were used in the SA-2 operation, and relaying the data back to a nearby DC-130 transport aircraft; acquisition of the signal led to developing methods to jam it as well.
The Washington Post ran a story headlined "Car Safety Critic Nader Reports Being 'Tailed'", by reporter Morton Mintz, a revelation that would eventually propel consumer advocate Ralph Nader to national fame and turn his recent book Unsafe at Any Speed into a bestseller.  Nader's crusade against General Motors had largely been overlooked, until "the company did not recognize the value of public relations and opted instead to use intimidation and harassment to shut down Nader... The result was the media coverage and attention GM had hoped to avoid."  Though the Post story ran on page 43, and did not get attention right away, other magazines and newspapers would soon investigate the story and make Nader's name a household word.
The closing ceremony of the 1966 Winter Universiade was held at Sestriere, Italy.
The Second Route of Western Australia's Eastern Railway was closed, after almost 70 years of operation.

February 14, 1966 (Monday)
At 12:01 a.m., "C-day" began and the currency of Australia was decimalised, and the Australian dollar was introduced, while the Australian pound would be phased out over two years under the auspices of the Decimal Currency Board.  Pound notes were replaced by two-dollar bills, ten-shilling notes by one dollar notes, and the shilling itself (12 pence) exchanged for a ten-cent piece.  The sixpence and the new five cent piece were interchangeable.  The nation's banks, which had been closed since February 9, began the exchange of monies upon opening Monday morning.
Soviet writers Yuli Daniel and Andrei Sinyavsky were convicted of authoring "anti-Soviet" books and sentenced to five and seven years hard labour, respectively.  Under the pen-name "Nikolai Arzhak", Daniel had written the story "Moscow Calling", which Judge Lev Smirnov concluded to be intentionally malicious.  Sinyavsky's "What Is Socialist Realism?" (written under name "Abram Tertz") was described by Judge Smirnov as "a mockery of the ideas of communist construction".
Twenty-three people were killed and 30 injured when the train they were in derailed after departing the town of Shwe Nyaung in northeast Burma and sent seven coaches into a deep ravine.

February 15, 1966 (Tuesday)
Seventeen people were killed in a tunnel near Locarno, Switzerland, when a drilling crew pierced a pocket of poisonous underground gas. Fifteen of the men were part of an Italian crew working on the project for a hydroelectric plant, and two others were firemen from Locarno who were part of a rescue team.
 The United Arab Republic (Egypt) indicted 45 members of the Muslim Brotherhood, accused of plotting to overthrow Abdel Nasser.
Mansur al-Atrash was re-elected speaker of Syria's National Council for the Revolutionary Command.
The Roman Catholic Diocese of Masan was established in South Korea.
John T. Hayward became President of the Naval War College at Newport, Rhode Island.
H. W. Fernando became Head of Bandarawela Central College, Sri Lanka.

Died: Camilo Torres Restrepo, 37, Colombian guerrilla leader who had renounced his position as a Roman Catholic priest in order to join the rebel National Liberation Army (ELN) to fight the government. Torres was killed in a skirmish with the Colombian military near Bucaramanga, but his philosophy of a "Christian Revolution" would inspire other people in Colombia.

February 16, 1966 (Wednesday)
One week before Ash Wednesday, Pope Paul VI issued the apostolic constitution Paenitemini, revising obligations for Roman Catholic Church adherents for Lent.  The age at which abstinence was required was raised to 14 years old, and the number of universal days of fasting days was reduced from 40 days to only two (Ash Wednesday and Good Friday), and the days of obligatory abstinence to eight (Ash Wednesday, Good Friday, and the Fridays in between).
The twentieth and last nuclear explosion in Algeria was conducted in the desert in a test by France, near the village of In Eker. Afterwards, until January 27, 1996, all French tests would take place at locations in the South Pacific Ocean, primarily at the atolls of Moruroa and Fangataufa.
Thirty-six people were killed, and 53 injured, by two bombs placed on an express train in the Indian state of Assam.  According to Railways Minister Ram Sabhag Singh, the train had been halted when a time bomb exploded in the rear compartment of a coach with passengers inside.  An hour later, while the victims were still being removed, a second bomb exploded in the front of the train, killing rescue workers and more passengers.
Twenty-nine people on a commuter train were killed as they approached the Yugoslavian city of Split (now in Croatia), and 27 more were injured.  The passenger train was impacted by a 19-car coal train that had been descending a steep grade when its brakes failed.
Sixteen coal miners died in an explosion near Kamp-Lintfort, West Germany. 
J. Carlyle Sitterson became Chancellor of the University of North Carolina at Chapel Hill.

February 17, 1966 (Thursday)
Reg Withers entered the Australian Senate, filling the vacancy caused by the death of Senator Sir Shane Paltridge. In the Australian House of Representatives, Joe Clark became Father of the House, and would go on to be the tenth longest-serving member of the House of Representatives.
Aeroflot Flight 65 crashed as it took off from Sheremetyevo International Airport near Moscow, in the first fatal accident involving the Soviet Tupolev Tu-114 turboprop airliner. A wing of the jet struck a snowbank while accelerating down the runway, which had not been cleared of snow adequately. Reportedly, the plane — which was inaugurating the first Aeroflot service to Brazzaville in the French Congo — reached an altitude of  before coming down, and the cabin broke in two. Initial reports set the death toll at 48 of the 70 people on board, though later reports confirmed the death toll at 21 of 48 people on board.
The FIS Nordic World Ski Championships opened at the Holmenkollen ski arena in Oslo, Norway.
At Geneva, representatives from Venezuela and the United Kingdom signed a treaty to delineate the boundary between Venezuela and British Guiana (now Guyana).
A spokesman for Secretary-General U Thant presented the "Three-point Proposal" for ending the Vietnam War at the United Nations headquarters in New York, calling for cessation of bombing of North Vietnam by the United States, a scaling down of military activities, and an agreement by all sides to enter into discussions with representatives of the Viet Cong.
The draft classification of world heavyweight boxing champion Muhammad Ali was reclassified from 1-Y (unfit for military service) to 1-A, after the armed services revised standards from accepting only the upper 15th percentile of IQ to the upper 30th percentile. The revision would lead to Ali's refusal to register on religious beliefs, his arrest, and the loss of his championship status.
The tanking test of Gemini launch vehicle (GLV) 8 was conducted. While the launch vehicle was being cleaned up after the test, spacecraft No. 8 Final Systems Test was completed February 23. On February 25, GLV and spacecraft were temporarily mated for an erector-cycling test. The extravehicular support package and life support system were checked out and installed in the spacecraft between February 26 and March 5, while GLV systems were modified and revalidated February 28 to March 3.
Edgar M. Cortright, NASA Deputy Associate Administrator for Space Science and Applications, testifying before the House Committee on Science and Astronautics' Subcommittee on Space Science and Applications, stressed selectivity in planning the space science program: "We have been looking at Apollo applications for some time to identify those areas of scientific activity where the man can be a real asset to the experiment, and the areas that interest us most are astronomy; natural resources, which is looking down at the earth with various detectors; biology which is concerned with long-duration weightless flight, from both a fundamental biological point of view and in preparation for longer flights; and of course continued lunar exploration."
Died: Hans Hofmann, 85, German-born American abstract expressionist painter

February 18, 1966 (Friday)
Burmese officials reported that the steering rod had snapped as the bus was driving on a curving mountain road.

In an attempt to give an artificial boost to the Nielsen ratings for a sweeps month television presentation of An Evening with Carol Channing, Rex Sparger conspired with Channing's husband, producer Charles Lowe, to pay viewers in 58 households in Ohio and Pennsylvania to watch the entire program. The Nielsen company's screening procedures detected the unusual spike of viewers in those locations, and omitted the areas from its sample that evening. Nielsen would file a $1,500,000 lawsuit against Sparger on March 24, which would be settled after Sparger signed a consent order conceding his attempt to distort the ratings. Sparger would reveal that he had found out the identities of contractors who serviced the meters placed on television sets, then followed them as they called on the sample homes.
Testifying before the House Committee on Science and Astronautics Subcommittee on Manned Space Flight, NASA Deputy Administrator Robert C. Seamans, Jr., described three basic elements in NASA's Apollo Applications Program (AAP) effort:
Extension of orbital staytimes to 45 days or more through minor modifications to the present Apollo system.
Procurement of additional spacecraft and launch vehicles for follow-on flights beyond the present Apollo schedule.
Utilization of Apollo vehicles during the 1968-1970 time frame if the agency's most optimistic Apollo schedules were realized.
"We cannot today look toward a permanent manned space station, or a lunar base, or projects for manned planetary exploration," Seamans stated, "until our operational, scientific and technological experience with major manned systems already in hand has further matured."
Born: Phillip DeFreitas, England cricketer, in Scotts Head, Dominica
Died: Grigori Nelyubov, 31, one of the twenty original Soviet cosmonauts, after being struck by a train in an apparent suicide attempt. Nelyubov and two other cosmonauts had been dismissed from the Soviet space program after getting into a fight with military guards on March 27, 1963.

February 19, 1966 (Saturday)
Britain's Navy Minister, Parliamentary Under-Secretary of State for Defence Christopher Mayhew, and the First Sea Lord, Sir David Luce, resigned in protest after the government's decision to shift British airpower from carrier-based planes to land-based planes and to cancel the CVA-01 aircraft carrier programme.
 The Central Committee of the Communist Party of the Soviet Union approved the Eighth Five-Year Plan, proposed by Premier Alexei Kosygin.
U.S. Senator Robert F. Kennedy became the first member of the Senate to break with President Johnson in proposing that the Viet Cong be allowed "a share of power and responsibility" in peace talks with the United States. "There are three things you can do with such groups," Kennedy said in a speech, "Kill or repress them, turn the country over to them, or admit them to a share of power."
Died: Alfred P. Sloan, 90, American automotive executive who served as Chairman of the Board of General Motors Corporation from 1937 to 1956.

February 20, 1966 (Sunday)
The Soviet Union revoked the citizenship of Soviet author Valery Tarsis, who had emigrated to the United Kingdom two weeks earlier.
The Norwegian oil tanker Anne Mildred Brovig collided with the British coaster MV Pentland off of the coast of West Germany near Heligoland.  Both ships caught fire and the Brovig sank, spilling 16,000 tons of its cargo of Iranian crude oil, the last major spill to threaten Germany.  Between the use of dispersants and favorable weather, the oil slick disappeared without damaging the German coast.
Cecilia Cummins was born in Richmond, North Yorkshire, the fifth child of the Cummins family to have a February 20 birthday since 1952, a coincidence that has been noted in the Guinness Book Of World Records since 1977 under the category "Most siblings born on the same day".  The book noted that the odds were one in 17,797,577,730.  Her arrival coincided with the birthdays of her sisters Catherine (14), Carol (13), Claudia (5) and her brother Charles (10).
 
Emmett Ashford became the first African-American Major League Baseball umpire, hired by the American League after 15 years of umpiring in the minor leagues.
After the injection of contaminated waste water into the mountains of the Rocky Mountain Arsenal caused earthquakes in Denver, Colorado, the program was halted.  Tremors had started one month after the first injection on March 8, 1962, then halted temporarily after a cessation of the process.
Born: Cindy Crawford, American model and actress, in DeKalb, Illinois
Died: Chester Nimitz, 80, U.S. Fleet Admiral who commanded the Pacific Fleet in World War II, and later Chief of Naval Operations.

February 21, 1966 (Monday)
In a televised press conference, French President Charles de Gaulle said that France would require command of all foreign troops and military institutions in France when the NATO agreement expired on April 4, 1969.  Soon afterward, De Gaulle would announce that France would withdraw on July 1, and that he wanted the troops, officers and bases of the United States and United Kingdom removed by April 1, 1967.
President Sukarno of Indonesia "reshuffled" his cabinet, starting with the removal of his Defense Minister, Abdul Haris Nasution, appointing enough sympathizers to create what was called the "Cabinet of 100 Ministers".  Dismissing advisers who opposed the Communist Party of Indonesia (PKI) and replacing them with PKI sympathizers, he fired seven of his nine State Ministers, the Commanders of the Navy and the Army, and reassigned others in order to reduce the generals' authority.  Within less than three weeks, he would be forced to hand over his executive authority to General Suharto.
Syria's Minister of Defence Muhammad Umran ordered the transfer of three key supporters of army chief Salah Jadid, Major-General Ahmad Suwaydani, Colonel Izzad Jadid and Major Salim Hatum.
The Senate Foreign Relations Committee approved Jack Hood Vaughn as Director of the Peace Corps, and Lincoln Gordon to replace him as Assistant Secretary of State for Inter-American Affairs. Senator Wayne Morse of Oregon cast the only dissenting vote. The Committee unanimously approved U.S. participation in the Asian Development Bank.

February 22, 1966 (Tuesday)

The Soviet Union launched two dogs, "Veterok" and "Ugolyok" (translated in the American press as "Breezy" and "Blackie", respectively) into orbit around the Earth on board the satellite Kosmos 110.  The two dogs would remain in orbit for 22 days and then safely return to Earth on March 16.
British Prime Minister Harold Wilson announced that the United Kingdom would withdraw its troops from the Aden Protectorate by 1968, endorsing the "Defence White Paper" that stated "we do not think it appropriate that we should maintain defence facilities there" after independence was granted.
Milton Obote, the Prime Minister of Uganda, called for a meeting of his cabinet.  After discussions started, he called in soldiers and then placed five of the group (State Minister Grace Ibingira, Agriculture Minister Mathias Ngobi, Health Minister Emmanuel Lumu, Minister of Works Balaki Kirya and Labour Minister George Magezi) under arrest on grounds that they had been "conspiring to overthrow the Government by violent means".
The Broadway production of Slapstick Tragedy: Two Plays by Tennessee Williams premiered at the Longacre Theatre.  Despite Williams's success with productions such as The Glass Menagerie, A Streetcar Named Desire and Cat on a Hot Tin Roof, the double-bill of plays (The Mutilated and The Gnädiges Fräulein) would close after only seven performances.
The 1966 Australian Grand Prix was held at Lakeside International Raceway and was won by Graham Hill.

February 23, 1966 (Wednesday)

Major General Salah Jadid launched a coup d'état, arresting President Amin al-Hafiz, Prime Minister Salah al-Din al-Bitar, Speaker of Parliament Mansour Attrish, and the Defense Minister, Major General Mohammed Omran. Major General Jedid had been leader of the extremist faction of the Ba'ath Party until a purge in December. A future President, Air Force General Hafez al-Assad, was named as the new Defense Minister. Hafiz's private residence was attacked by troops led by Salim Hatum and Rifaat al-Assad. Jadid appointed Nureddin al-Atassi as the new figurehead President, and Yusuf Zu'ayyin was restored to office as Prime Minister.
Isaac Adaka Boro, leader of the rebel Ijaw Volunteer Force, captured the city of Yenagoa with a force of 159 youths, then declared the independence of the short-lived Niger Delta People's Republic; the Republic lasted only 12 days before police arrived from Lagos and arrested the rebels.
A British Defence White Paper, recommending withdrawal of British presence in Aden, was published.
A successful Booster Flight Acceptance Composite Test (B-FACT) completed subsystems testing of Atlas target launch vehicle 5302. Component problems had delayed completion of some of the vehicle pad tests, including B-FACT, which had first been run on February 4. Difficulties were also encountered in completing the propellant tanking tests.

The astronaut maneuvering unit (AMU) scheduled to be tested on the Gemini IX mission was delivered to Cape Kennedy. The receiving inspection revealed nitrogen leaks in the propulsion system and oxygen leaks in the oxygen supply system. Reworking these systems to eliminate the leakage was completed on March 11. Following systems tests, the AMU was installed in spacecraft No. 9 (March 14-18).
On February 23 and 24, over 600 representatives of U.S. Government agencies and industrial firms participating in Project Gemini attended a Gemini Midprogram Conference at Manned Spacecraft Center. They heard some 44 papers describing the development of spacecraft and launch vehicle, flight operations, and the results of the first seven Gemini missions, including the findings of experiments performed during these missions.

February 24, 1966 (Thursday)

A military coup in Ghana overthrew President-for-Life Kwame Nkrumah while he was making a state visit to Beijing.  Former Major General Joseph A. Ankrah, who had been fired the year before by Nkrumah, was named as the leader of the seven-man National Liberation Council that took control of the government.  Across Ghana, enthusiastic crowds tore down statues that Nkrumah had erected for himself as "Redeemer of the Nation".  Declassified CIA and U.S. State Department documents, released in 2001, would show that the U.S., the U.K. and France provided the funding to the coup leaders. Ankrah would be forced to resign on April 3, 1969, after being charged with corruption.
Two days after arresting cabinet members, Uganda's Prime Minister Milton Obote fired Sir Edward Mutesa and took over as the new President of Uganda.
Student protesters outside of the presidential palace in Jakarta were killed when Indonesian President Sukarno's guards fired into the crowd.
Born: Billy Zane, American film actor, in Chicago

February 25, 1966 (Friday)
Pursuant to the peace agreement signed by both nations on January 10 in Tashkent, India and Pakistan completed their troop withdrawals from the disputed territory, returning to the locations that they had occupied as of August 5, 1965, prior to the beginning of the Indo-Pakistani War of 1965. The last Indian troops left at sunset.
Sir Ivan Stedeford Hospital opened in Ambattur, in India's Chennai state.

The coat of arms of Guyana was granted by the College of Arms.
Maurice J. Raffensperger, Director of Manned Earth Orbital Mission Studies at NASA HQ, summarized the outcome of discussions and agreements between Washington and the Centers regarding the S-IVB Workshop project:
MSFC had overall responsibility for the Workshop system design and integration, with a design objective of a 30-day flight capability.
The Gemini office at MSC had contractual and design responsibility for the airlock module, using basic Gemini components where feasible. (It was anticipated that McDonnell Aircraft Corporation would be the logical contractor.) Also, MSC would manage the CSM portion of the Workshop concept.
MSFC was responsible for implementing the S-IVB Workshop experiment program and integrating experiments into the Workshop.
Raffensperger called for compilation of a Workshop planning document (something like a short version of a preliminary project development plan) so that NASA HQ could proceed with steps for authorization and definitive implementation of the project.
Born: Téa Leoni, American television and film actress, in New York City

February 26, 1966 (Saturday)
As the Cultural Revolution progressed, China's television stations were ordered to broadcast model plays (Yang Ban Xi) as the sole entertainment.
In South Vietnam, South Korean soldiers allegedly killed 380 villagers in the Bình An commune (today known as xã Tây Vinh) in the Tây Sơn District of Bình Định Province.
The Soviet Union made its first test of an intercontinental ballistic missile referred to by them as the RT-2, and in the United States as the SS-13 Savage, but the launch was unsuccessful. A liftoff would be achieved on November 4 "and even then its warhead disintegrated on reentry".

AS-201, the first test flight of the Saturn IB rocket and of the Apollo capsule, was successful. The uncrewed spacecraft was sent  into space, and the capsule's heat shields withstood  of heat during re-entry through the Earth's atmosphere. The aircraft carrier USS Boxer recovered the vehicle in the South Atlantic Ocean,  from Ascension Island.
Andrew Brimmer became the first African-American to be appointed a governor of the Federal Reserve System. He would remain with "the Fed" until 1974, then serve again in the 1990s as Vice-Chairman.
Born: 
Jennifer Grant, American television actress (Beverly Hills 90210), to actors Cary Grant and Dyan Cannon, in Burbank, California
Najwa Karam, Lebanese singer, in Zahlé
Died: Vinayak Damodar Savarkar, 82, Indian pro-independence activist, politician, poet and playwright

February 27, 1966 (Sunday)
Pu Laldenga and other leaders of the Mizo National Front (MNF) planned an uprising in India to take place on March 1.
In elections for Bulgaria's parliament, all 416 candidates of the Fatherland Front won election without opposition. Of those, 280 were members of the Bulgarian Communist Party and 99 from the affiliated Bulgarian National Agrarian Union. In the yes/no vote, the slate won overwhelming approval, with a reported 5,744,072 yes votes and 2,089 against them. The turnout was said to have been 99.6 percent. Prime Minister Todor Zhivkov, General Secretary of the BCP, continued in office as Prime Minister.
Gemini Agena target vehicle (GATV) 5004 completed systems testing at Sunnyvale. It was formally accepted by the Air Force on March 11, following the vehicle acceptance team inspection. The next day (March 12), GATV 5004 was shipped by air to Eastern Test Range, arriving March 14.

February 28, 1966 (Monday)
South Pacific Airlines of New Zealand ceased operations.

During a stormy meeting with Davis Hughes, Minister for Public Works of New South Wales, Danish architect Jørn Utzon, designer of the Sydney Opera House, withdrew from the project due to non-payment of fees.
Mannathu Padmanabha Pillai laid the foundation stone for NSS College, Nenmara in Nemmara, Palakkad district, Kerala, India.
Israeli peace activist Abie Nathan flew his airplane, Shalom 1, from Israel to Port Said, Egypt, where he was arrested.
Emperor of Ethiopia Haile Selassie opened an Organization of African Unity meeting of foreign ministers.

With the National Liberation Council now in control of Ghana after the coup on February 24, the original Flag of Ghana was reinstated.
The Grand Ducal Guard of Luxembourg was officially disbanded.
Eugène Ionesco's play Hunger and Thirst received its world premiere at the Comédie-Française in Paris.
British Prime Minister Harold Wilson called a General Election in the United Kingdom, to be held on 31 March.
Dr. Rolando Cubela Secades was arrested in Havana, Cuba, along with a fellow Cuban Army Major, Ramon Guin, on charges that they were agents for the U.S. Central Intelligence Agency who were plotting to assassinate Fidel Castro, Cuba's Prime Minister. A CIA report, dated April 25, 1967, and declassified in 1997, would confirm that Cubela had been contacted on numerous occasions with different plans for a Castro assassination. After serving 13 years of a 25-year prison sentence, Cubela would be pardoned by Castro on August 27, 1979, and allowed to leave Cuba.
American astronauts Elliot M. See, Jr., 38, and Charles A. Bassett II, 34, were killed in an aircraft accident in St. Louis, Missouri, during training for the Gemini program. See and Bassett, who had been scheduled to travel into space on Gemini IX in May 1966, died when their Northrop T-38 Talon jet training plane crashed in rain and fog short of the St. Louis Municipal Airport. The jet, which had been cleared for an instrument landing, was left of center in its approach to the runway when it turned toward the McDonnell Aircraft complex,  from the landing strip. It hit the roof of the three-story building where Gemini spacecraft nos. 9 and 10 were being housed, bounced into an adjacent courtyard, and exploded. Several McDonnell employees were slightly injured. Minutes later the Gemini IX backup astronauts, Thomas P. Stafford and Eugene A. Cernan, who had been flying behind See and Bassett in another T-38 plane, landed safely. The four astronauts were en route to McDonnell for two weeks' training in the simulator. NASA Headquarters announced that Stafford and Cernan would fly the Gemini IX mission on schedule and appointed Alan B. Shepard, Jr., to head a seven-man investigating team.
Stage I of Gemini launch vehicle 10 was erected in the east cell of the vertical test facility at Martin-Baltimore. After completing horizontal testing March 3, stage II was erected March 7. Power was applied to the vehicle for the first time on March 14. Subsystems Functional Verification Tests were completed April 13.
The Oregon State Highway Department completed construction of the Marquam Bridge in Portland.

At the 23rd Golden Globe Awards, the winning films were Doctor Zhivago and The Sound of Music.
Born:
Vincent Askew, American professional basketball player, in Memphis, Tennessee
Abdallah Chikota, Tanzanian politician
Nathan Crowley, English production designer, in London
Christopher C. Cummins, American chemist, in Boston, Massachusetts
Éric Dubus, French Olympic middle-distance runner, in Pézenas, Hérault, France
Scott Fountain, American football offensive lineman and coach, in East Brewton, Alabama
Paulo Futre, Portuguese association football player, in Montijo, Portugal
Thomas Geisser, German mathematician, in Wuppertal, West Germany
Tim Goad, American football defensive tackle, in Claudville, Virginia
Paul Groves, English association football player and coach, in Derby, England
Ross Hale, English amateur boxer, in Bristol, England
Roar Hansen, Swedish association football manager, in Stidsvig, Sweden
Mike Jones, American freestyle motocross competitor, in Pittsburgh, Pennsylvania
Per Lodenius, Swedish politician, in Norrtälje
Edita Mildažytė, Lithuanian journalist and documentarian, in Kapsukas, Lithuanian Soviet Socialist Republic
John Nagl, United States Army officer, in Vallejo, California
David Nevins, American television producer, in Washington, D.C.
Ndue Paluca, Albanian politician, in Qafë-Mali, Pukë, Albania
Philip Reeve, British children's author and illustrator, in Brighton, Sussex, England
Robert Rowland, British politician, in Bowdon, Greater Manchester, England (died 2021, diving accident)
Edward Shearmur, British film composer, in London
Saud bin Muhammed Al Thani, Qatari prince, Minister of Culture, Arts and Heritage (died 2014)
Jovan Vraniškovski, Eastern Orthodox Archbishop of Ohrid, in Bitola, Socialist Federal Republic of Yugoslavia
Dan Weiss, American-born Japanese basketball player, in San Jose, California
Detmar Westhoff, German art historian and curator, in Bonn, West Germany
Ickey Woods, American football running back, in Fresno, California
Died:
Schamyl Bauman, 72, Swedish film director
George Harrison Dunbar, 87, Canadian politician
Jonathan Hale, 74, Canadian-born film and television actor, suicide by firearm
Léonie Keingiaert de Gheluvelt, 80, Belgian feminist and pioneering woman mayor
Elliot See, 38, American astronaut, plane crash
Charles Bassett, 34, American astronaut, plane crash

References

1966
1966-02
1966-02